The 1992–93 season was the 55th season of competitive association football in the Football League played by Chester City, an English club based in Chester, Cheshire.

Also, it was the seventh season spent in the Third Division, which was renamed the Second Division before the season started, after the promotion from the Fourth Division in 1986. Alongside competing in the Football League the club also participated in the FA Cup, the Football League Cup and the Football League Trophy.

Football League

Results summary

Results by matchday

Matches

FA Cup

League Cup

Football League Trophy

Season statistics

References

1992-93
English football clubs 1992–93 season